The Ministry of Home Affairs (IAST: Gṛha Maṃtrālaya), or simply the Home Ministry, is a ministry of the Government of India. As an interior ministry of India, it is mainly responsible for the maintenance of internal security and domestic policy. The Home Ministry is headed by Union Minister of Home Affairs Amit Shah. 

The Home Ministry is also the cadre controlling authority for the Indian Police Service (IPS), DANIPS and DANICS. Police-I Division of the ministry is the cadre controlling authority in respect of the Indian Police Service; whereas, the UT Division is the administrative division for DANIPS.

Senior officials

Home Secretary and other senior officials

The Home Secretary (IAST: Gṛiha Sachiva गृह सचिव) is the administrative head of the Ministry of Home Affairs. This post is held by a very senior IAS officer of the rank of Secretary to Government of India. The current Home Secretary is Ajay Kumar Bhalla. All Central Forces such as the CRPF, CISF, BSF, etc. and the Union territory police forces are under the control of the Union Home Secretary. The Union Home Secretary is the Chief Advisor to Union Home Minister on all matters such as policy formation, etc. The Post of Union Home Secretary is equivalent to the Chief Secretary of a State. The Union Home Secretary draws salary at the pay level 17 of 7th Central Pay Commission i.e Rupees 2,25,000 plus other allowances applicable per month which is equivalent to a Chief Secretary's salary.

Organizational structure of home ministry 
https://www.mha.gov.in/sites/default/files/ORGANIZATIONAL_STRUCTURE_02122021_0.pdf

Central Armed Police Forces and domestic intelligence agency 
Chiefs of CAPFs, NIA and IB report directly to the Home Minister. DGs of CAPFs may also report to Special Secretary (Internal Security) and Special Secretary/Additional Secretary (Border Management).

Department of Home (State Ministers)

Organisation

Departments
The Ministry of Home Affairs extends manpower and financial support, guidance and expertise to the State Governments for the maintenance of security, peace and harmony without trampling upon the constitutional rights of the States.

The Ministry of Home Affairs has the following constituent Departments:

Department of Border Management 
Department of Border Management, dealing with management of borders, including coastal borders.

Department of Internal Security 
Department of Internal Security, dealing with police, law and order and rehabilitation.

Department of Jammu, Kashmir and Ladakh Affairs 

Department of Jammu, Kashmir and Ladakh Affairs, dealing with the constitutional provisions in respect of the Union Territories Jammu, Kashmir and Ladakh and all other matters relating to the UTs excluding those with which the Ministry of External Affairs is concerned.

Department of Home 
Dealing with the notification of assumption of office by the President and Vice-president, notification of appointment of the Prime Minister and other Ministers, etc.

Department of Official Language 
Dealing with the implementation of the provisions of the Constitution relating to official languages and the provisions of the Official Languages Act, 1963. Department of Official Language was set up in June 1975 as an independent Department of the Ministry of Home Affairs.

Department of States 
Dealing with centre-state relations, inter-state relations, union territories and freedom fighters' pension.

Divisions
These are organisational divisions of the ministry itself, without the splitting into specialised departments.

Administration Division 
Handling all administrative and vigilance matters, allocation of work among various Divisions of the ministry and monitoring of compliance of furnishing information under the Right to Information Act, 2005, matters relating to the Order of Precedence, Padma Awards, Gallantry Awards, Jeevan Raksha Padak Awards, National Flag, National Anthem, State Emblem of India and Secretariat Security Organisation.

Border Management Division 
Matters relating to coordination by administrative, diplomatic, security, intelligence, legal, regulatory and economic agencies of the country for the management of international borders, the creation of infrastructure like roads/fencing and floodlighting of borders, border areas development programme pilot project on Multi-purpose National Identity Card and Coastal Security.

Centre-State Division 
The division deals with Centre-State relations, including working of the constitutional provisions governing such relations, appointment of governors, creation of new states, nominations to Rajya Sabha/Lok Sabha, Inter-State boundary disputes, over-seeing the crime situation in States, imposition of President's Rule and work relating to Crime and Criminal Tracking Network System (CCTNS) etc.

Coordination Division 
Intra-Ministry coordination work, parliamentary matters, public grievances (PGs), publication of annual report of the ministry, record retention schedule, annual action plan of the ministry, custody of classified and unclassified records of the ministry, internal work study, furnishing of various reports of scheduled castes/scheduled tribes and persons with disabilities, etc..

Disaster Management Division 
Responsible for the response, relief and preparedness for natural calamities and man-made disasters (except drought and epidemics). The division is also responsible for legislation, policy, capacity building, prevention, mitigation and long-term rehabilitation.

Finance Division 
The division is responsible for formulating, operating and controlling the budget of the ministry under the Integrated Finance Scheme.

Foreigners Division 
The division deals with all matters relating to visa, immigration, citizenship, overseas citizenship of India, acceptance of foreign contribution and hospitality.

Freedom Fighters and Rehabilitation Division 
The division frames and implements the Freedom Fighters' Pension Scheme and the schemes for rehabilitation of migrants from former West Pakistan/East Pakistan and provision of relief to Sri Lankan and Tibetan refugees. It also handles work relating to Enemy Properties and residual work relating to Evacuee Properties.

Human Rights Division 
The division deals with matters relating to the Protection of Human Rights Act and also matters relating to national integration and communal harmony.

Internal Security Division-I 
Internal security and law and order, including anti-national and subversive activities of various groups/extremist organisations, policy and operational issues on terrorism, security clearances, monitoring of ISI activities and Home Secretary-level talks with Pakistan on terrorism and drug trafficking as a part of the composite dialogue process.

Recently launched cyber coordination centre (CYCORD) https://cycord.gov.in meant for providing assistance to LEAs in all the matter of cyber-crime, cyber-espionage and cyber-terrorism works under this division.

Internal Security Division-II 
Division deals with arms and explosive; letters of request for mutual legal assistance in criminal matters; National Security Act, 1980 and representations thereunder; administration of Narcotics Control Bureau; providing central assistance to victims of terrorist, communal and naxal violence; matters relating to breach of privilege of MPs, etc.

Judicial Division 
Legislative aspects of the Indian Penal Code (IPC), Code of Criminal Procedure (CrPC) and also the Commission of Inquiry Act. It also handles matters relating to state legislations, which require the assent of the President under the Constitution, political pension to erstwhile rulers before independence, mercy petitions under Article 72 of the Constitution.

Left Wing Extremism Division. 
Countering of left-wing Naxalite-Maoist extremism in India.

North East Division 
The division deals with the internal security and law and order situation in the northeastern states, including matters relating to insurgency and talks with various extremist groups operating in that region.

Police Division-I 
Division functions as the cadre controlling authority in respect of Indian Police Service (IPS) and also deals with the award of Presidents' police Medals for Meritorious/ Distinguished service and Gallantry, etc.

Police Division-II 
This Division deals with the policy, personnel, operational (including deployment) and financial matters relating to all the Central Armed Police Forces (CAPFs). It also deals with the matters relating to welfare of the serving and retired CAPF personnel and the deployments in UN peacekeeping missions.

Police Modernisation Division 
The division handles all items of work relating to modernisation of State Police Forces, provisioning/procurement of various items for modernisation of Central Police Forces, police reforms and police mission.

Policy Planning Division 
The division deals with matters relating to policy formulation in respect of internal security issues, international co-operation on counter-terrorism, international covenants, bilateral assistance treaties and related items of work.

Union Territories Division 
The division deals with all legislative and constitutional matters relating to Union territories, including National Capital Territory of Delhi. It also functions as the cadre controlling authority of the Arunachal Pradesh-Goa-Mizoram-Union Territories (AGMUT) cadre of the Indian Administrative Service (IAS), the Indian Forest Service (IFS/IFoS), and the Indian Police Service (IPS) as also Delhi, Andaman and Nicobar Islands Civil Service (DANICS)/Delhi, Andaman and Nicobar Islands Police Service (DANIPS). Besides, it is responsible for overseeing the crime and law and order situation in UTs.

Agencies under the Ministry of Home Affairs

Departments

Department of Internal Security
 Indian Police Service (IPS)
 Intelligence Bureau
 Central Reserve Police Force
 Bureau of Police Research and Development
 Central Industrial Security Force
 Delhi Police
 National Security Guard
 National Institute of Criminology and Forensic Sciences 
 National Crime Records Bureau
 National Civil Defence College
 National Investigation Agency ( NIA )
 North Eastern Council
 North Eastern Police Academy
 Office of the Registrar General and Census Commissioner, Census of India
 Sardar Vallabhbhai Patel National Police Academy
 Narcotics Control Bureau

Department of Official Language
 Central Translation Bureau
 Central Hindi Training Institute
 Directorate of Census Operations 
Department of Jammu and Kashmir Affairs
Department of Jammu, Kashmir and Ladakh Affairs deals with the UTs of Jammu,Kashmir & Ladakh, administration of the Armed Forces(J&K) Special Powers Act,1990 (21 of 1990) and all matters relating to the UTs of Jammu,Kashmir & Ladakh, including Counter-terrorism within Jammu and Kashmir and coordination in respect of subjects/matters specifically allotted to any other Ministry/Department like coordination with Ministry of Defence as regards manning and managing the line of control between India and Pakistan, but excluding those with which the Ministry of External Affairs is concerned. The Department also coordinates with various Ministries/Departments, primarily concerned with development and welfare activities in Jammu,Kashmir & Ladakh.

Department of Home

Department of States

Central Armed Police Forces
 Border Security Force
 Indo-Tibetan Border Police
 Sashastra Seema Bal
 Central Reserve Police Force
 Central Industrial Security Force
 National Security Guards
 Special Frontier Force

Bureaus

 Bureau of Immigration, India
 Bureau of Police Research and Development, Libraries Network
 Narcotics Control Bureau (NCB)
 National Crime Records Bureau (NCRB)

Autonomous Bodies, Boards & Corporations
 National Foundation for Communal Harmony (NFCH)
 Repatriates Co-operative Finance and Development Bank Limited

Boards / Academies / Institutions (Grant in Aid)
 Central Recordkeeping Agency (CRA) for the New Pension System (NPS), NSDL
 National Industrial Security Academy (NISA), CISF, Hyderabad
 Rehabilitation Plantations Limited (RPL)
 Scheduled Tribes and Other Traditional Forest Dwellers
 Welfare and Rehabilitation Board (WARB), New Delhi
 National Securities Depository Limited (NSDL)
 Centre for Disaster Management, LBSNAA, Mussoorie
 National Institute of Disaster Management (NIDM)
 Officers Training Academy
 Regional Institute of Correctional Administration (RICA)

Regulatory Authorities

 National Disaster Management Authority

Commissions/Committees/Missions
Committee for Consultations on the Situation in Andhra Pradesh (CCSAP)
Committee of Parliament on Official Language

Councils
Inter-State Council

Regional/Field Offices (Central Government)
Census of Kerala
Census of Orissa
Directorate of Census Operation, Rajasthan
Directorate of Census Operation, Madhya Pradesh
Directorate of Census Operations, Chandigarh
Directorate of Census Operations, Gujarat
Directorate of Census Operations, Karnataka
Directorate of Census Operations, Punjab, Chandigarh
Directorate of Census Operations Tamil Nadu
Central Industrial Security Force (CSIF), South Zone, Chennai
Frontier Headquarters Border Security Force, Tripura
India Disaster Resource Network, IDRN
Multi Purpose National Identity Card
North Bengal Frontier, Border Security Force
Punjab Frontier, Border Security Force
Rustamji Institute of Technology (RJIT)
South Bengal Frontier, Border Security Force
Town Official Language Implementation Committee, Ahmedabad

See also 

 Parliamentary Standing Committee on Home Affairs
 Law enforcement in India
 Indian Police Foundation and Institute

References

 Amit Shah takes charge of Home Ministers of India 2019

External links

 Official website
 Official website 
 Directory of Important Web Links of MHA
 Ministry of Home Affairs : Foreigners Division
 Official MHA Press Releases

 
Home Affairs
India